TJ Hassan (born 23 May 1981) is a film, television and stage actor. He is perhaps best known for several supporting and leading roles both in independent and mainstream films and television.

Career 

His first film role was in the Jerry Zaks directed 2008 biopic Who Do You Love?, playing Lonnie Johnson, an American blues musician, opposite Alessandro Nivola and Chi McBride. Other supporting roles in films included Lottery Ticket, The Change-Up and For Colored Girls. Television appearances include guest starring as Major Brett Hagen, an Army psychiatrist on the Lifetime series Army Wives, Detective Chico Cubbs on the Comedy Central-produced series M'larky, along with Dan Fogler, Gilbert Gottfried, Jeffrey Ross, and Lennon Parham, and the ABC Family film My Future Boyfriend. He was also the face of the 2010 Coke Zero Playbook of Possibilities campaign.

Filmography

Film

Television

References

External links

 TJ Hassan Official Website

1981 births
Living people
British male film actors
British male stage actors
British male television actors
Male actors from London
21st-century British male actors
People from Kingsbury, London